Michael O'Connor (27 February 1900 – 26 December 1957) was an Irish water polo player. He competed at the 1924 Summer Olympics and the 1928 Summer Olympics.

References

External links
 

1900 births
1957 deaths
Irish male water polo players
Olympic water polo players of Ireland
Water polo players at the 1924 Summer Olympics
Water polo players at the 1928 Summer Olympics
Sportspeople from Belfast